Events in the year 1858 in Portugal.

Incumbents
Monarch: Peter V
Prime Minister: Nuno José Severo de Mendoça Rolim de Moura Barreto, 1st Duke of Loulé

Events
 2 May - Legislative election.

Arts and entertainment

Sports

Births

5 March – José Relvas, land owner and politician (died 1929)

Deaths

References

 
1850s in Portugal
Portugal
Years of the 19th century in Portugal
Portugal